To the Ends of the Earth is a trilogy of novels by William Golding, published from 1980 to 1989.

To the Ends of the Earth or To the End of the Earth may also refer to:

Music
 To the End of the Earth Tour, a 2013–2014 concert tour by Jessica Mauboy

Albums
 To the Ends of the Earth, a 1996 album by Monty Alexander's Ivory & Steel
 To the Ends of the Earth (album), a 2002 compilation album by Hillsong United

Songs
 "To the Ends of the Earth" (Nat King Cole song), 1956
 "To the Ends of the Earth", a 1984 song by English Dogs
 "To the Ends of the Earth", a song by Marty Sampson from the 2003 album Hope
 "To the Ends of the Earth", a song by Blue Sky Black Death from the 2011 album Noir
 "To the Ends of the Earth", a song by Keane from the 2013 album The Best of Keane
 "To the End of the Earth", a 2013 song by Jessica Mauboy

Other uses
 To the Ends of the Earth (1948 film), directed by Robert Stevenson
 To the Ends of the Earth (2019 film), directed by Kiyoshi Kurosawa
 To the Ends of the Earth (TV series), a 2005 three-part BBC television miniseries adaptation of the trilogy of novels of the same name by William Golding
 To the Ends of the Earth, a 1983 book by Ranulph Fiennes

See also
 End of the Earth (disambiguation)
 Ends of the Earth (disambiguation)